Ethiene Cristina Gonser Franco (born 27 April 1992) is a Brazilian female artistic gymnast and part of the national team.  She participated at the 2008 Summer Olympics, and 2012 Summer Olympics in London, United Kingdom.

References

1992 births
Living people
Brazilian female artistic gymnasts
Gymnasts at the 2012 Summer Olympics
Olympic gymnasts of Brazil
Place of birth missing (living people)
Gymnasts at the 2008 Summer Olympics
South American Games gold medalists for Brazil
South American Games silver medalists for Brazil
South American Games medalists in gymnastics
Competitors at the 2006 South American Games
Competitors at the 2010 South American Games
20th-century Brazilian women
21st-century Brazilian women